The Open Body is a 2022 Gothic folk horror drama film directed by  from a screenplay by Huerta and Daniel D. García, based on the story "Lobosandaus" by Xosé Luís Méndez Ferrín. It stars Tamar Novas alongside María Vázquez and Victória Guerra. It was primarily shot in Galician and Portuguese.

Plot 
Set in 1909, the plot follows Miguel, a teacher destined to the fictional Galician village of Lobosandaus, in the border between Spain and Portugal. After his arrival to the village, he meets with Obdulia, a woman seemingly possessed by the spirit of her sister-in-law Dorinda's former (male) lover. Miguel, a man of reason, begins to question himself about the supernatural.

Cast

Production 
The screenplay was written by Ángeles Huerta and Daniel D. García, based on Xosé Luís Méndez Ferrín's story "Lobosandaus" (from the book Arraianos). Shooting locations included Muíños, Lobeira, and Calvos de Randín (all in the Spanish province of Ourense) and the Portuguese villages of Tourém and Pitões (both in Montalegre). It was primarily shot in Galician and Portuguese, also featuring dialogue in Spanish.

Release 
Filmax acquired international rights to the film. The Open Bodys festival run included screenings at the Lisbon International Horror Film Festival (MOTELX), the Ourense International Film Festival, the 67th Valladolid International Film Festival (Seminci), and the 60th Gijón International Film Festival. It was released theatrically in Spain on 9 December 2022.

Reception 
Pablo Vázquez of Fotogramas rated the film 3 out of 5 stars, highlighting Novas (in his best performance to date) as the film's standout while citing's the film's "somewhat cumbersome" narration as a negative point.

 of Cinemanía rated the film 3½ stars, summing it up as "an honest search for the ghost of the evil dreamed".

Miguel Anxo Fernández of La Voz de Galicia deemed The Open Body to be "an honest, brave and well-finished film, destined to last", confirming Ángeles Huerta as "a solvent and welcome director" in the scope of fiction.

Accolades 

|-
| rowspan = "16" align = "center" | 2021 || rowspan = "16" | 21st Mestre Mateo Awards || colspan = "2" | Best Film ||  || rowspan = "16" | 
|-
| Best Director || Ángeles Huerta || 
|-
| Best Screenplay || Ángeles Huerta, Daniel D. García || 
|-
| Best Actor || Tamar Novas || 
|-
| rowspan = "2" | Best Actress || María Vázquez || 
|-
| Victoria Guerra || 
|-
| Best Supporting Actress || Elena Seijo || 
|-
| Best Supporting Actor || Federico Pérez Rey || 
|-
| Best Cinematography || Gina Ferrer || 
|-
| Best Editing || Sandra Sánchez || 
|-
| Best Original Score || Mercedes Peón || 
|-
| Best Production Supervision || Tamara Soto Mato || 
|-
| Best Art Direction || Antonio Pereira || 
|-
| Best Sound || Diego Staub, Jordi Rossinyol || 
|-
| Best Costume Design || Teresa Sousa || 
|-
| Best Makeup and Hairstyles || Raquel Fidalgo, Noé Montes, María Barreiro || 
|}

See also 
 List of Spanish films of 2022

References

External links 
 

2022 drama films
2022 horror films
2020s horror drama films
2020s Portuguese-language films
2020s Spanish films
2020s Spanish-language films
2020s supernatural horror films
Films about educators
Films based on short fiction
Films set in 1909
Films set in Galicia (Spain)
Films shot in Galicia (Spain)
Films shot in Portugal
Folk horror films
Galician-language films
Gothic horror films
Portuguese horror films
Spanish horror drama films
Spanish supernatural horror films